Canalispira lipei is a species of very small sea snail, a marine gastropod mollusk or micromollusk in the family Cystiscidae.

Description

The Canalispira lipei is classified as a Neogatsropoda. Typically living in the demersal zone with a depth range of 75-100m. Members of the order Neogastropoda are mostly gonochoric and broadcast spawners. Life cycle: Embryos develop into planktonic trocophore larvae and later into juvenile veligers before becoming fully grown adults.

Distribution

Western Atlantic.

References

Cystiscidae
Gastropods described in 2007